PalaSojourner is a basketball indoor sporting arena located in Rieti, Italy. The capacity of the arena is 3,500 people. It was the home of AMG Sebastiani Basket and is currently home of N.P.C. Rieti team. It is named after Willie Sojourner, a star for the Sebastiani in the late 1970s and early 1980s.

Indoor arenas in Italy
Basketball venues in Italy
Rieti
Sports venues in Lazio